Wu Renbi (died 901, courtesy name Tingbao) was a late Tang dynasty Taoist and man of letters. An eccentric man, Wu was eventually killed by the warlord Qian Liu for refusing to write the eulogy for Qian's mother Lady Shuiqiu. Eleven of his poems survived in the collection Quan Tangshi.

Biography
Wu Renbi was originally from Sū Prefecture. He studied astrology and occult Taoism during his youth. At some point he allegedly studied after a Taoist master in Mount Lu for a few years. In 890, he passed the imperial examination with honors, but given the volatile political situation, with warlords overrunning the nation, he decided to enter the relatively stable territory of warlord Qian Liu in modern Zhejiang. With no money, he begged on the street, and soon Qian Liu heard of his fame and politely sought his service. Qian first asked Wu to interpret astrological signs; Wu said he did not know. Qian then asked Wu to serve in his retinue, and Wu refused again. In late 901, Qian Liu's mother Lady Shuiqiu died. After the funeral service, Qian asked Wu to write the eulogy to be inscribed on her tomb stele. Wu's denial this time incensed a grieving Qian Liu, who immediately ordered Wu Renbi to be thrown into the river and drowned.

References

 

901 deaths
Tang dynasty poets